Car, Violin and Blot the Dog is a 1974 Soviet family film directed by Rolan Bykov.

Plot 
Two friends (jack of all trades and violinist) love one girl. She reciprocates both of them, and her brother Kuzya wants to get a lot of cats and make them a monkey.

Cast 
 Oleg Anofriev as Electric guitar / Accordion	
 Rolan Bykov as Conductor / driver Leonid Lomakin / old deaf-mute lady Marya Fyodorovna	
 Georgiy Vitsin as Banjo / Guitar
 Zinoviy Gerdt as Drums / David's grandfather / David's father
 Nikolay Grinko as Contrabass / Oleg's father
 Mikhail Kozakov as Violin / Bass guitar / Tall cook	
 Aleksei Smirnov as Helicon / Plump cook / house manager Ferdyshenko
 Spartak Mishulin as Musician without instrument / Taxi driver
 Aleksandr Chernyavsky as Kuzya
 Natalya Tenishchyova as Anya Khoroshaeva

References

External links 
 

1974 films
1970s Russian-language films
Soviet children's films
Mosfilm films
Films directed by Rolan Bykov